Oceania Cup Winners Cup was one of the two main Oceania tournaments for clubs, the other one is Oceania Champions League. It was only played in 1987 and Sydney City (Australia, qualified as NSL Cup winners in 1986) emerged as winners in a single match against North Shore United (New Zealand, qualified as Chatham Cup winners in 1986).

Results

Line-ups

North Shore United
Gilgrist, Loader, Ironside, Simpson, Darlington (Harding), Cole, Boath, Hobbs, Mackay, Harrison (Worsley), Hagan

Sydney City
Gosling, Rodrigues, Robertson, O'Connor, Hooker, Lee, Souness(Parrish), McCulloch, de Marigny, Barnes, Saad (Patterson); coach: Eddie Thomson

External links
OFC Official Website
Ocenia Club Competitions 1987 | RSSSF 

Champions League, OFC
2